Tasovice:
 Tasovice, Blansko District
 Tasovice (nad Dyjí), Znojmo District

See also 
 Tasov (disambiguation)
 Tašovice

Czech words and phrases